Votkinsk (Votka) is an industrial town in the Udmurt Republic, Russia. Population:

History
It was established in April 1759, initially as a center for metallurgical enterprises, and the economic focus on metal related industry remains. Town status was officially granted to it in 1935.

The city of Votkinsk was one of the residence centers of the Udmurt Jews, who spoke Udmurtish Yiddish.

Administrative and municipal status
Within the framework of administrative divisions, Votkinsk serves as the administrative center of Votkinsky District, even though it is not a part of it. As an administrative division, it is incorporated separately as the town of republic significance of Votkinsk—an administrative unit with the status equal to that of the districts. As a municipal division, the town of republic significance of Votkinsk is incorporated as Votkinsk Urban Okrug.

Economy
The Moscow Institute of Thermal Technology operates a machine plant in the town, the Votkinsk Machine Building Plant, which produces some of Russia's long-range ballistic missiles. Under the Intermediate-Range Nuclear Forces Treaty (INF) concluded between the United States and the Soviet Union, the missile production facility at Votkinsk was selected for long-term on-site monitoring by U.S. inspectors. The corresponding site for the Soviet Union in the United States was the Hercules missile production facility in Salt Lake City, Utah.

The town gives its name to the nearby Votkinsk Reservoir, filled in the 1960s following the construction of a dam for the Votkinsk Hydroelectric Station.

Geography

Climate
Votkinsk has a warm summer continental climate. (Koppen Dfb)

Sports
The bandy team Znamya-Udmurtiya has played in the highest division, and nowadays play in the second highest, Russian Bandy Supreme League.

Notable people

The town is the birthplace of Pyotr Ilyich Tchaikovsky, a Russian composer who spent the first eight years of his life here. Today, the house of his birth is home to the Tchaikovsky Museum.

Also the high jumper Rudolf Povarnitsyn was born in Votkinsk. His greatest achievement was a bronze medal at the 1988 Summer Olympics for the USSR. His personal best jump of 2.40 metres, set in Donetsk, was also the world record from August 11 to September 4, 1985, when Igor Paklin beat it by one centimetre. Rudolf's record is unique in that his personal best preceding his record setting competition was 2.26 m.

International relations
Votkinsk has a sister city, as designated by Sister Cities International:
 West Jordan, Utah, United States

References

Notes

Sources

Cities and towns in Udmurtia
Sarapulsky Uyezd